Strelcha Spur (‘Rid Strelcha’ \'rid 'strel-cha\) is the rocky, partly ice-covered spur extending 5.3 km in south-southeast to north-northwest direction and 1.4 km wide, rising to 1572 m in the west foothills of Bruce Plateau on Graham Coast in Graham Land, Antarctica.  It has steep and partly ice-free west, north and east slopes, and surmounts Birley Glacier to the north and east, and a tributary to that glacier to the west.

The spur is named after the town of Strelcha in Southern Bulgaria.

Location
British mapping in 1971.

Maps
 Antarctic Digital Database (ADD). Scale 1:250000 topographic map of Antarctica. Scientific Committee on Antarctic Research (SCAR). Since 1993, regularly upgraded and updated.
British Antarctic Territory. Scale 1:200000 topographic map. DOS 610 Series, Sheet W 65 64. Directorate of Overseas Surveys, Tolworth, UK, 1971.

Notes

References
 Bulgarian Antarctic Gazetteer. Antarctic Place-names Commission. (details in Bulgarian, basic data in English)
Strelcha Spur. SCAR Composite Antarctic Gazetteer

External links
 Strelcha Spur. Adjusted Copernix satellite image

Mountains of Graham Land
Bulgaria and the Antarctic
Graham Coast